Bill Jones (born Belinda Jones in Staffordshire, England) is an English folk singer/songwriter. Jones won the BBC Folk Award in 2001.

Discography 
 Turn to Me (Boing, 2000)
 Panchpuran (Brick Wall Music, 2001)
 Bits & Pieces EP (Brick Wall Music, 2001)
 Live at The Live (Brick Wall Music, 2002)
 Two Year Winter (Brick Wall Music, 2003)
 Wonderful Fairytale (Brick Wall Music, 2019)

References

External links 
 Brick Wall Music
Bill Jones at AllMusic
 Bill Jones at BBC Music

English folk musicians
Year of birth missing (living people)
Living people
Musicians from Staffordshire